Southwestern Michigan College is a public community college with its main campus near Dowagiac, Michigan.  It also has a campus just outside the city limits of Niles, Michigan.

History

Southwestern Michigan College was founded on November 19, 1964 after the voters of Cass County, Michigan approved a $1.5 million tax levy to fund a Cass County Community College.  On September 12, 1965 ground was broken for the main campus in Dowagiac, Michigan. Classes began at Southwestern Michigan College in September 1966.  The college is located three miles (5 km) outside of Dowagiac, Michigan city limits. 

SMC had a strong intercollegiate athletics program, gaining particular national renown for its cross country program. Competing under the Roadrunners mascot, the cross country team won five national championships and 23 Michigan Community College Athletics Association (MCCAA) Championships. It also produced three hall of fame runners and 41 All-Americans.  
Intercollegiate athletics were disbanded in 1998. In 2020, it was announced that intercollegiate cross country running would return beginning fall 2021. Intramural and club sports have also been an active aspect of campus life throughout the college's history.

Academics
Southwestern Michigan College offers Associate in Applied Science, Associate in Arts, and Associate in Science degrees as well as certificate programs. It also offers bachelor's degrees on the Dowagiac campus through partnerships with Ferris State University, allowing students to take three years of classes at SMC's low tuition and pay only one year of the university's tuition.  Additionally, the college has partnered with Michigan State University to help students earn an MSU certificate while also working towards an associate degree. Students take at least 21 credits from SMC which are recognized by MSU toward completion of a certificate.

The college is accredited by the Higher Learning Commission. It is also a member of the American Association of Community Colleges.

Main campus
Currently the Main Campus houses 10 buildings:
 Jan and A.C Kairis Building
 Barbara Wood Building
 Charles O. Zollar Building (Student Activity Center)
 Dale A. Lyons Building
 Foster W. Daugherty Building
 Fred L. Mathews Library and Conference Center
 Keith H. McKenzie Hall (Student Housing)
 William M. White Hall (Student Housing)
 Thomas F. Jerdon Hall (Student Housing)
 David C. Briegel Building
 William P.D. O'Leary Building

Student Activity Center
The Student Activity Center is the center of campus life. It houses a fitness center, gymnasium, rock climbing gym, cafe, student theater, and game room complete with pool, foosball, Ping Pong, arcade games, and video games. All student facilities and events are free for all students. Community members can also buy memberships or day passes to the fitness center.

Satellite campus
In July 1992 the Niles Campus opened with a new  facility, located just outside the city limits of Niles, Michigan.  In 1999 a  addition was completed which came close to doubling the size of the Niles Campus.  In 2001 a  Michigan Technology Center was add to the Niles Campus.  This building is known as the Harry T. Gast Building, named for the former Michigan state senator. Renovations began on the main building at the Niles Campus in 2013, and continued improvements are planned.

On-campus student housing
SMC housing offers apartment style living with full kitchens and secure, private bedrooms. These fully furnished four-bedroom apartments have two bathrooms. SMC housing covers all utilities including wired and wireless internet, air conditioning, electricity, and water.

In fall 2009, Southwestern Michigan College opened their first residential housing facility on campus with a 130-bed student housing unit. On August 16, 2009 the residence hall was dedicated and named in honor of Keith H. McKenzie. Southwestern Michigan College's second housing unit, East Hall, on the College's Dowagiac campus opened for the fall 2010 semester.

Due to continuing high demand, SMC built their third housing facility which opened to students in 2013. Originally named South Hall, the building became William M. White Hall on August 19, 2013; East Hall was renamed Thomas F. Jerdon Hall on this date as well.

Board of trustees
Southwestern Michigan College is governed by a seven-member locally elected board of trustees.

References

External links
Official website

Educational institutions established in 1964
Public universities and colleges in Michigan
Education in Cass County, Michigan
Buildings and structures in Cass County, Michigan
1964 establishments in Michigan
Two-year colleges in the United States